Conus pusio is a species of sea snail, a marine gastropod mollusk in the family Conidae, the cone snails and their allies.

Like all species within the genus Conus, these snails are predatory and venomous. They are capable of "stinging" humans, therefore live ones should be handled carefully or not at all.

Distribution
This marine species occurs off the Dominican Republic; in the Caribbean off Guadeloupe; Martinique; off Brazil; in the Mid-Atlantic Ridge.

Description 
The maximum recorded shell length is 24.5 mm.

Habitat 
Minimum recorded depth is 0 m. Maximum recorded depth is 23 m.

References

 Bernardi, A. B., 1862. Description d'un cône nouveau. Journal de Conchyliologie 10: 404–405
 Fischer-Piette, E., 1950. Listes des types décrits dans le Journal de Conchyliologie et conservés dans la collection de ce journal. Journal de Conchyliologie 90: 8–23
 Puillandre N., Duda T.F., Meyer C., Olivera B.M. & Bouchet P. (2015). One, four or 100 genera? A new classification of the cone snails. Journal of Molluscan Studies. 81: 1–23

External links
 The Conus Biodiversity website
 Cone Shells – Knights of the Sea
 
 Syntype at MNHN, Paris

pusio
Gastropods described in 1792